H8 is the name of a large family of 8-bit, 16-bit and 32-bit microcontrollers made by Renesas Technology, originating in the early 1990s within Hitachi Semiconductor. An administrator on the Renesas user community boards commented in 2011 that there are no plans for further development of H8 based products. The family of largely CISC machines is unrelated to the higher-performance SuperH family of 32-bit RISC-like microcontrollers.

It was supported in the Linux kernel starting with version 4.2 but support was removed in version 5.19.

Variants
Subfamilies include the 8/16-bit H8/300 and H8/500, the 16/32-bit H8/300H and H8S and the 32-bit H8SX series, each with dozens of different variants, varying by speed, selection of built-in peripherals such as timers and serial ports, and amounts of ROM, flash memory and RAM. Built-in ROM and flash memory tends to range from 16 KB to 1024 KB, and RAM from 512 B to 512 KB.

The basic architecture of the H8 is patterned after the DEC PDP-11 architecture, with eight 16-bit registers (the H8/300H and H8S have an additional bank of eight 16-bit registers), and a variety of addressing modes. Unlike the PDP-11 however, the H8 architecture employs big-endian byte ordering.

Both H8/300H and H8S have eight 32-bit registers, each of which can be treated as one 32-bit register, two 16-bit registers, or two 8-bit registers, with the H8S having an internal 32-bit configuration. Several companies provide compilers for the H8 family, and there is a complete GCC port, including a simulator. There are also various hardware emulators available.

The family is continued with the H8SX 32-bit controllers.

Applications

H8S may be found in digital cameras, the Cybiko handheld computers, some ThinkPad notebooks, printer controllers, smart cards, chess computers, music synthesizers and in various automotive subsystems. The LEGO Mindstorms RCX, an advanced robot toy/educational tool, uses the H8/300. Namco employed an H8/3002 as a sound processor for various games it made in the late 1990s, notably those using its System 12 architecture.

H8/500 was being also used on a Nokia 2110 phone.

In popular culture
H8 is referenced in the Muse song "Space Dementia".

References

External links
  Renesas Electronics
 Online training for Renesas products
 A community support forum

Renesas microcontrollers